Les Wilson may refer to:

 Les Wilson (baseball) (1885–1969), American baseball player
 Les Wilson (field hockey) (born 1952), New Zealand field hockey player
 Les Wilson (musician) (1924–1997), New Zealand country music singer and songwriter, also known as "The Otago Rambler"
 Les Wilson (soccer) (born 1947), Canadian soccer administrator and former professional player

See also
Leslie Wilson (disambiguation)